Major General John Eugene McMahon (December 8, 1860 – January 28, 1920) was a United States Army officer who served in numerous conflicts, most notably in World War I, where he commanded the 5th Division. He also was the father of John E. McMahon Jr. (1890-1971), a career Army officer who attained the rank of brigadier general.

Early life
McMahon was born on December 8, 1860, in Buffalo, New York, to Colonel John E. McMahon and Esther Bryan McMahon. He graduated from Fordham University in 1880 with an A.B. degree, and he entered the United States Military Academy (USMA) at West Point, New York, and graduated number eleven of seventy-seven in the class of 1886. Several of his fellow classmates included men who would, like McMahon himself, eventually rise to general officer rank, such as John J. Pershing, Charles T. Menoher, Walter Henry Gordon, Edward Mann Lewis, Mason Patrick, Julius Penn, Avery D. Andrews, George B. Duncan, Ernest Hinds, William H. Hay, James McRae, Lucien Grant Berry and Jesse McI. Carter.

Military career

McMahon was commissioned in the Fourth Artillery. From 1891 to 1895, he was an aide to General Alexander McDowell McCook. During the Spanish–American War, he was the adjutant general of Second Brigade, Provisional Division, from June to July 1898. He was in Puerto Rico in 1898 and 1899, and served during the Philippine–American War. On December 17, 1917, he was promoted to major general (NA). He commanded the 5th Infantry Division of the American Expeditionary Force from January 1 to October 18, 1918. He was also commanding general, 41st Infantry Division from October 21 to 23, 1918.

He retired as a colonel due to disabilities in 1919. His rank of major general was restored posthumously in 1930.

Personal life
He married Caroline Bache on May 12, 1888 and was a modern languages instructor at the United States Military Academy from 1890 to 1891. He died in Princeton, New Jersey, at the age of 59 on January 28, 1920. He was buried at Oak Hill Cemetery in Washington, D.C.

References

External links

1860 births
1920 deaths
United States Army Infantry Branch personnel
Military personnel from New York City
United States Military Academy alumni
American military personnel of the Philippine–American War
United States Army generals of World War I
American military personnel of the Spanish–American War
United States Army generals
United States Military Academy faculty
People from Buffalo, New York
Burials at Oak Hill Cemetery (Washington, D.C.)
Fordham University alumni